Fernando Miguel may refer to:
 Fernando Miguel (footballer, born 1979), retired Brazilian footballer
 Fernando Miguel (footballer, born 1985), Brazilian goalkeeper